The Vanuatu white-eye or yellow-fronted white-eye (Zosterops flavifrons)  is a small passerine bird belonging to the genus Zosterops in the white-eye family Zosteropidae. It is endemic to Vanuatu, where it is one of the most common birds.

The adult male is yellow-green above while the underparts are bright yellow or yellow-green depending on the subspecies. The forehead is yellow and there is a white ring around the eye. The legs and feet are dark grey and the bill is brown above and pinkish below. Female and immature birds are similar to the male but paler. The immatures also have a narrower eye-ring.

The contact call is short and high-pitched. The song is a repeated warbling.

There are seven subspecies distributed almost throughout Vanuatu from the Banks Islands in the north to Aneityum in the south. The species occurs in a variety of habitats including forest, plantations and gardens from sea level to the mountains. It forages in bushes and trees, moving around in pairs or small flocks. The varied diet includes insects, nectar and fruit such as lantana berries and wild figs.

The neat, cup-shaped nest is built  or more above the ground and is made of grass, pieces of bark and spider webs. The eggs are bluish-white and there are three in a clutch.

References

 Bregulla, Heinrich L. (1992) Birds of Vanuatu, Anthony Nelson, Oswestry, England.
 Doughty, Chris; Day, Nicolas & Plant, Andrew (1999) Birds of the Solomons, Vanuatu & New Caledonia, Christopher Helm, London.

Birds described in 1789
Taxa named by Johann Friedrich Gmelin
Birds of Vanuatu
Endemic fauna of Vanuatu
Zosterops